M3 Records (formerly known as M3 Macmil Music) is an American independent hip hop record label in New York City, headed by rapper Masta Ace. The label was founded in 2003, nearly two years after Ace's former label, JCOR Records, folded. The first nationally distributed release on the label was Ace's fifth studio album A Long Hot Summer. The label is now home to Ace's supergroup eMC, which also features underground duo Punch & Words and Milwaukee rapper Strick.

Roster
 Masta Ace
 Wordsworth (not signed to M3 Hip Hop)
 Strick
 eMC
 Bundies

Former: Punchline (Rapper)
DeLaZoo (Rapper and Singer)

Discography
2004: Masta Ace - A Long Hot Summer
2008: eMC - The Show
2009: Masta Ace & Edo G - Arts & Entertainment
2010: Masta Ace & Edo G - Extra Entertainment  
2012: Masta Ace - MA DOOM: Son of Yvonne
2015: eMC - The Tonite Show
2016: Masta Ace - The Falling Season

See also
 List of record labels

External links
M3 Hip Hop Official Website
M3 Macmil Music at Discogs

Record labels established in 2003
Hip hop record labels
American independent record labels